2.0 is the debut studio album by American electronic music band Big Data. It was released on March 20, 2015 under Warner Bros. Records. From the album, two singles have been released; titled "Dangerous" featuring indie rock band Joywave and "The Business of Emotion" featuring White Sea.

The album peaked at 75 on the Billboard 200 chart.

This song "Clean" featuring Jamie Lidell featured in Konami video game, Pro Evolution Soccer 2017; "The Business of Emotion" was re-recorded in Simlish for the video game The Sims 4.

Track listing 
All songs produced by Alan Wilkis.

References 

2015 debut albums
Big Data (band) albums
Warner Records albums